Yu Wuling (810–?) was a Chinese poet of the late Tang dynasty. His birth name was Yu Ye; Wuling was his courtesy name.

He attained a jinshi degree in the imperial examination, but gave up his position in order to wander around the country.

His best-known poem is the jueju "Offering Wine", and Book 595 of the Quan Tangshi is devoted to his poetry.

Biography 

He was born in 810, in Duqu (in modern-day Xi'an, Shaanxi Province). What little is known of his life comes from the Tang Cai Zi Zhuan.

The name by which he is usually known, Wuling, was his courtesy name, his birth name having been Yu Ye.

During the Dachong era (847–859) he attained a jinshi degree in the imperial examination. Unsatisfied with his position, he took up a life of wandering around various parts of the country.

After giving up his position at court and travelling around the country, he is supposed to have shown particular fondness for Dongting Lake and the Xiang River. He spent his later years living in seclusion south of Mount Song.

The date of his death is unknown.

Poetry 
There is an anthology of his poetry called the Yu Wuling Ji. The two primary texts of his poems are found in Book 595 of the eighteenth-century Quan Tangshi and the Tangren Wushi Jia Xiaoji, which each order his poems differently.

His best-known poem is the jueju "Offering Wine".

Ueki et al. speculate, based on a passage in the Song Huiyao that records that qū zhī were offered as tribute from Srivijaya, that the "golden flagon" in this poem may also have been a valuable imported item. This, combined with the use of mǎn zhuó ("brimming") create an atmosphere in the first half of the quatrain of an extravagant banquet. This atmosphere contrasts with that of the last two lines, which carry the implication that one should drink deeply before the blossoms fall, before the time for parting arrives.

The final line of this poem has become particularly well-known and is sometimes taken to represent Yu Wuling's view of life. Masuji Ibuse's Japanese translation of this poem is also famous.

Notes

References

Works cited

External links 
Book 595 of the Quan Tangshi (which collects Yu Wuling's poems) in the Chinese Text Project

810 births
Year of death unknown
Tang dynasty politicians from Shaanxi
Tang dynasty poets
9th-century Chinese poets
Poets from Shaanxi
Politicians from Xi'an
Date of death missing
Writers from Xi'an